The 1928 Minnesota gubernatorial election took place on November 6, 1928. Republican Party of Minnesota candidate Theodore Christianson defeated Farmer–Labor Party challenger Ernest Lundeen.

Results

See also
 List of Minnesota gubernatorial elections

External links
 http://www.sos.state.mn.us/home/index.asp?page=653
 http://www.sos.state.mn.us/home/index.asp?page=657

Minnesota
Gubernatorial
1928
November 1928 events in the United States